Jesudasu Seelam, a politician from Indian National Congress party, who was the Member of the Parliament of India representing Andhra Pradesh in the Rajya Sabha, the upper house of the Parliament from 2004 till 2016. He was Minister of State (Revenue) under the Ministry of Finance from 17 June 2013. Prior to entering politics he served as an Indian Administrative Service (IAS) officer from 1984-99 of Karnataka cadre.

External links
 Profile on Rajya Sabha website

References

Indian National Congress politicians from Andhra Pradesh
Living people
Rajya Sabha members from Andhra Pradesh
Indian Administrative Service officers
1953 births
People from Guntur district